George Smith (22 July 1855 – 7 April 1897) was an Australian cricketer. He played two first-class cricket matches for Victoria between 1877 and 1885.

See also
 List of Victoria first-class cricketers

References

External links
 

1855 births
1897 deaths
Australian cricketers
Victoria cricketers
Cricketers from Melbourne